Anna Galmarini Mayeur (15 October 1942 – 28 January 1997) was an Italian figure skater. She finished eighth at the 1960 Winter Olympics in Squaw Valley, California. She was coached by Erich Zeller.

After retiring from competition, Galmarini performed with Ice Capades in the United States and worked as a coach. She married Jules Mayeur, Head Carpenter with the show.

Competitive highlights

References 

1942 births
1997 deaths
Italian female single skaters
Italian emigrants to the United States
Olympic figure skaters of Italy
Figure skaters at the 1960 Winter Olympics